Frederick Thomas Willey (13 November 1910 – 13 December 1987) was a British Labour Party politician. He was a Member of Parliament (MP) representing a Sunderland constituency for 38 years, from 1945 to 1983.

Early life
Willey was educated at Durham Johnston School and St John's College, Cambridge, and was called to the Bar in 1936. He worked as a barrister on the Northern Circuit.

His political career as an activist for social justice and other left-wing causes began in the 1930s, when he was the keynote speaker welcoming returning International Brigade volunteers to Sunderland.

Military career
During the Second World War Willey served with the Auxiliary Fire Service (AFS) and was an officer of the Fire Brigades Union.

Parliamentary career
Willey was elected to the House of Commons as Member of Parliament (MP) for Sunderland in 1945, when the Borough still sent two MPs to Parliament. In 1950 two-member constituencies were abolished and Willey was returned for the new constituency of Sunderland North, where he served until he retired before the general election of 1983.

Willey served as Parliamentary Secretary to the Ministry of Food from 1950 to 1951, and as Minister of Land and Natural Resources from 1965 to 1967. He opened the UK's first long-distance footpath, the Pennine Way, in 1965.

He served as Chairman of the Parliamentary Labour Party from 1979 to 1981.

References

External links 
 

1910 births
1987 deaths
Alumni of St John's College, Cambridge
British barristers
British firefighters
British trade unionists
Labour Party (UK) MPs for English constituencies
Members of the Privy Council of the United Kingdom
Ministers in the Attlee governments, 1945–1951
People from Durham, England
UK MPs 1945–1950
UK MPs 1950–1951
UK MPs 1951–1955
UK MPs 1955–1959
UK MPs 1959–1964
UK MPs 1964–1966
UK MPs 1966–1970
UK MPs 1970–1974
UK MPs 1974
UK MPs 1974–1979
UK MPs 1979–1983
Civil Defence Service personnel